"Madame Hollywood" is the third single featuring Miss Kittin from Felix da Housecat's album Kittenz and Thee Glitz.

Composition
"Madame Hollywood" is credited as a tech house and electroclash song.

Critical reception
Paul Cooper of Pitchfork Media said,"Kittin's dull-as-dishwater celebrity fantasies and irritatingly neutral delivery pale in comparison to how Harrison Crump performs in an identical environment. It's the difference between true talent and a plastic knock-off."

Music video
The music video for "Madame Hollywood" was directed by Guy Sagy. It features elderly ladies lip-synching to the song.

Live performances
Miss Kittin performed "Madame Hollywood (Ursula 1000 Remix)" live for the Sónar festival and included it on her album Live at Sónar.

Track listing
U.S. Vinyl single
 "Madame Hollywood (Tiga's Mister Hollywood Version)" - 	
 "Madame Hollywood (Ursula 1000 Remix)" - 	
 "Silver Screen Shower Scene (Adult Mix)" - 	
 "Madame Hollywood (Richard Vission Remix)" - 
 "Madame Hollywood (Ralph Myerz and the Jack Herren Band Remix)" -

Charts

Weekly charts

Year-end charts

Song usage
"Madame Hollywood' was used on the mix album Ultra.80's vs Electro. Tiga included his "Madame Hollywood (Tiga's Mister Hollywood Version)" on his mix album DJ-Kicks: Tiga.

References

2002 singles
2001 songs
Felix da Housecat songs
Miss Kittin songs
Songs written by Miss Kittin